American Daughter  is a Russian road comedy-drama film directed by Karen Shakhnazarov

Plot
Alexey is a musician at a Moscow restaurant, who arrives in San Francisco to kidnap his daughter. Little Anya was secretly taken away by his ex-wife, who is married to a respectable American.

After a touching meeting with his daughter, they begin hitchhiking throughout America, full of comedic situations and adventures.

He ends up in prison for kidnapping and the former spouse visits him and offers a deal - he will be released if he signs the official refusal of the child. Alexey does not agree to abandon his daughter.

Some time passes. In the American prison, the prisoners are busy doing yard work, but suddenly the roar of a helicopter that flies around, and then lands directly on the territory of the zone, is heard in the sky. The cockpit door opens. At the helm is Anya. She calls her father who is perplexed, but gets into the helicopter with his American friend. They take off.

Cast
 Vladimir Mashkov as Alexey
  as Anya / Anne
 Maria Shukshina as Olga Varakina, Anya's mother
 Armen Dzhigarkhanyan as Archie Ardov
 Teddy Lane Jr. as  Smith

Awards and nominations

References

External links
 
Карен Шахназаров:  Я не экранизирую свою жизнь

1990s road comedy-drama films
1995 films
Russian road comedy-drama films
Films directed by Karen Shakhnazarov
Mosfilm films
1990s English-language films
1990s Russian-language films
1995 multilingual films
Russian multilingual films